Oligoryzomys chacoensis, also known as the Chacoan colilargo or Chacoan pygmy rice rat, is a rodent species from South America. It is found in the Gran Chaco region of southeastern Bolivia, southwestern Brazil, Paraguay, and northeastern Argentina. Its karyotype has 2n = 58 and FNa = 74.

It is one of the hosts of the hantavirus serotype Bermejo.

References

Literature cited

Weksler, M., Bonvicino, C., Pardinas, U., Teta, P., Jayat, J.P. and D'Elia, G. 2008. . In IUCN. IUCN Red List of Threatened Species. Version 2009.2. <www.iucnredlist.org>. Downloaded on November 27, 2009.

Oligoryzomys
Mammals of Argentina
Mammals of Bolivia
Mammals of Brazil
Mammals of Paraguay
Gran Chaco
Mammals described in 1981
Taxa named by Michael D. Carleton